John Anthony Gill (10 January  1898 – 18 July 1967) was an Australian rules footballer who played with Hawthorn Football Club in the Victorian Football League (VFL).

Early life
Jack Gill was the youngest of nine children of Thomas Gill (1858–1929) and Bridget Annie Gill, nee O'Callaghan (1857–1927), and was born and raised in the St Kilda area.

Football
Gill joined Hawthorn from St Kilda Juniors at the start of the 1922 VFA season and he continued to play throughout their first four seasons of VFL football, making 40 appearances in this competition including being a member of their inaugural VFL side.

After football
After his football career Gill worked as a stockbroker in Melbourne. He married Melinda Christina Kate Ingram in 1928 and they had two children together (Ted and Peter) and lived in Ormond.

Death
Jack Gill died in 1967 at the age of 69.

References

External links 

1898 births
1967 deaths
Australian rules footballers from Melbourne
Hawthorn Football Club (VFA) players
Hawthorn Football Club players
Stockbrokers
People from St Kilda, Victoria